Nestler is a surname. Notable people with the surname include:

Britta Nestler (born 1972), German materials scientist
Chrétien Géofroy Nestler (1778–1832), French botanist and pharmacist
Christine Nestler (born 1940), German cross-country skier
Elisabeth Nestler (born 1951), Austrian figure skater
Eric J. Nestler, American neuroscientist and academic
Gaby Nestler, East German cross-country skier
Gerry Nestler, American musician
Johann Karl Nestler (1783–1842), Czech-German scientist
Vincenzo Nestler (1912–1988), Italian chess player